The Play-offs of the 2007 Fed Cup Americas Zone Group II were the final stages of the Group II Zonal Competition involving teams from the Americas. Using the positions determined in their pools, the nine teams faced off to determine their placing in the 2007 Fed Cup Americas Zone Group II, with the top two teams of each pool playing for first to fourth. The teams finishing first advanced to Group I for the next year.

Promotion play-offs
The first and second placed teams of each pool were placed against each other in two head-to-head rounds. The winner of the rounds advanced to Group I for 2008.

Uruguay vs. Bolivia

Ecuador vs. Paraguay

Fifth to Sixth play-offs
The third-placed teams from each pool were drawn in head-to-head rounds to find the fifth and sixth placed teams.

Bermuda vs. Guatemala

Seventh to Eighth play-offs
The fourth-placed teams from each pool were drawn in head-to-head rounds to find the seventh and eighth placed teams.

Honduras vs. Trinidad and Tobago

Ninth
As there was only four teams from Pool A as opposed to the five from Pool B, the last-placed team from Pool B had no equivalent to play against. Thus the Barbadians were automatically allocated ninth place.

Final Placements

  and  advanced to 2008 Fed Cup Americas Zone Group I. The Paraguayans placed fifth overall, while the Uruguayans placed last and thus were relegated back to Group II for 2009.

See also
Fed Cup structure

References

External links
 Fed Cup website

2007 Fed Cup Americas Zone